New Grass Revival was an American progressive bluegrass band founded in 1971, and composed of Sam Bush, Courtney Johnson, Ebo Walker, Curtis Burch, Butch Robins, John Cowan, Béla Fleck and Pat Flynn. They were active between 1971 and 1989, releasing more than twenty albums as well as six singles. Their highest-charting single is "Callin' Baton Rouge", which peaked at No. 37 on the U.S. country charts in 1989 and was a Top 5 country hit for Garth Brooks five years later.

In 2020, the group were inducted into the Bluegrass Music Hall of Fame.

Origin
The origins of New Grass Revival lay in the Bluegrass Alliance, which Sam Bush (vocals, fiddle, guitar, mandolin) and Courtney Johnson (banjo, vocals) joined in 1970. At the time, the Alliance also featured bassist Ebo Walker and fiddler Lonnie Peerce. Following this, Curtis Burch (dobro, guitar, vocals) joined the band, whilst in 1972, Peerce left the band, but the remaining members decided to continue under the new name New Grass Revival. The band released their debut album, The Arrival of the New Grass Revival, later in 1972 on Starday Records.

History

Separation from mainstream bluegrass
The New Grass Revival bucked tradition, with long hair, informal clothing, and performances of songs from a variety of genres, including music by Jerry Lee Lewis ("Great Balls of Fire"), the Beatles ("Get Back"; "I'm Down"), and Bob Marley ("One Love/People Get Ready"), plus protest songs ("One Tin Soldier"). This break from bluegrass tradition was not well received in some quarters—some thought it was not the way Bill Monroe meant for bluegrass to be played. "Our reason for doing the newer-type music wasn't pretentious or irreverent or sarcastic or disrespectful," explained Curtis Burch. "We just felt like people were ready to see that you could really expand the sound, using those same instruments."  In 1979, they became the backup group and opening act for Leon Russell.

First line-up (1972–1981)
After the release of their debut, Walker left and was replaced by Butch Robins, who was with the band from July 1973 to November 1974. He was replaced by John Cowan, an Evansville, Indiana, native. This line-up was stable throughout the 1970s, recording albums on Flying Fish Records. New Grass Revival never played traditional bluegrass — all of the members brought elements of rock and roll, jazz, and blues to the group's sound. Consequently, certain portions of the bluegrass community scorned them, but they also gained a devoted following of listeners.

Second line-up (1981–1989)
In 1981, Johnson and Burch left the band being tired of touring. Bush and Cowan continued the group, replacing them with virtuoso banjoist Béla Fleck and guitarist Pat Flynn. Fleck's compositions such as "Metric Lips", "Seven by Seven" and "Big Foot" were well received as were Pat Flynn's "Do What You Gotta Do", "Lonely Rider" and "On The Boulevard". Pat Flynn also brought strong lead and harmony vocals to the group as well as a distinctive guitar style.

In 1984, the group moved to Sugar Hill Records, and released their first album featuring the new line-up, On the Boulevard. In 1986, the band signed with EMI Records and released an eponymous album, which proved to be their breakthrough into the mainstream. Two of the singles from the album, "What You Do to Me" and "Ain't That Peculiar", were minor hits on the country chart, and Fleck's showcase "Seven by Seven" was nominated for a Grammy Award for Best Country Instrumental. Hold to a Dream, released in 1987 contained hit singles including "Unconditional Love" and "Can't Stop Now."

In 1989, New Grass Revival released their third major-label album, Friday Night in America, which was another commercial success. "Callin' Baton Rouge" became their first Top 40 single, followed by the number 58 hit "You Plant Your Fields." Even though the band was more popular than ever, Bush decided to pull the plug on the group after the release of Friday Night in America. Bush formed The Sam Bush Band, and Fleck went on to a successful and respected solo career.

After break-up
In 1993, Bush, Cowan, Fleck, and Flynn returned to the studio, to back Garth Brooks, on his recording of "Callin' Baton Rouge".

Banjoist Courtney Johnson died of lung cancer in 1996 at age 56.  Bush, Fleck, Cowan, and Burch reunited for one concert (September 24, 1996) at the Ryman Auditorium in Nashville, Tennessee to benefit his widow. The concert included a number of musicians and groups, such as John Hartford, Hot Rize, Tim O'Brien, Vassar Clements, Del McCoury Band, Ricky Skaggs, Pete Rowan, Jerry Douglas and others.

In 1997, when Garth Brooks was invited on Late Night with Conan O'Brien to perform "Do What You Gotta Do", a song written by Pat Flynn, he asked Flynn, Bush, Cowan, and Fleck to join him in performing it.  Since that performance, Flynn has worked with both Cowan and Fleck, but not Bush. Likewise, Bush has also worked with Cowan and Fleck on numerous occasions. Bush and Cowan have also played with Burch.

In April 2007, Bush, Fleck, Cowan, and Flynn stepped into the spotlight together during the Merlefest 20th Anniversary Jam and played the Townes Van Zandt song "White Freight Liner."  The single-song reunion was the first time the four of them had played together in a decade.

Sam Bush, John Cowan and Curtis Burch performed with their own groups on the world's first International Newgrass Festival 21–23 August 2009 at Ballance Motox, Kentucky.

Personnel

1972–1973
Sam Bush - mandolin, fiddle, guitar, vocals
Curtis Burch - guitar, Dobro, vocals
Courtney Johnson - banjo, guitar, vocals
Ebo Walker - acoustic bass, vocals

1973-1974
Sam Bush - mandolin, fiddle, guitar, vocals
Curtis Burch - guitar, Dobro, vocals
Courtney Johnson - banjo, guitar, vocals
Butch Robins - bass guitar

1974–1981
Sam Bush - mandolin, fiddle, guitar, vocals
Curtis Burch - guitar, Dobro, vocals
Courtney Johnson - banjo, guitar, vocals
John Cowan - bass guitar, vocals

1981–1989
Sam Bush - mandolin, fiddle, guitar, vocals
Pat Flynn - guitar, vocals
Béla Fleck - banjo, guitar, vocals
John Cowan - bass guitar, vocals

1996 reunion
(Benefit concert for Courtney Johnson)
Sam Bush - mandolin, fiddle, guitar, vocals
Curtis Burch - guitar, Dobro, vocals
Béla Fleck - banjo, guitar, vocals
John Cowan - bass guitar, vocals

Discography

References

External links
 Curtis Burch website
 Sam Bush official website
 John Cowan official website
 Bela Fleck official website
 Pat Flynn official website
 Courtney Johnson obituary
 Butch Robins official website
 

American bluegrass music groups
Musical groups established in 1971
Musical groups disestablished in 1989
Musical groups from Louisville, Kentucky
Bluegrass musicians from Kentucky
1971 establishments in Kentucky
Country music groups from Kentucky
Flying Fish Records artists
Progressive bluegrass music groups
Sugar Hill Records artists
Stony Plain Records artists
Capitol Records artists
Rounder Records artists
Starday Records artists